The Boys Are Back is an American sitcom television series created by Matthew Carlson that was aired on CBS from September 11, 1994, to January 28, 1995. It stars Suzanne Pleshette and Hal Linden as parents Jackie and Fred Hansen. The show was broadcast on Wednesdays at 8 p.m. Eastern time.

Cast
Hal Linden as Fred Hansen
Suzanne Pleshette as Jackie Hansen
George Newbern as Mike Hansen	
Bess Meyer as Judy Hansen
Kevin Crowley as Rick Hansen
Justin Cooper as Nicky Hansen 
Ryan O'Donohue as Peter Hansen
Kelsey Mulrooney as Sarah Hansen

Episodes

References

External links 
 
 

1994 American television series debuts
1995 American television series endings
1990s American sitcoms
CBS original programming
English-language television shows
Television series about families
Television series by Disney–ABC Domestic Television
Television shows set in Portland, Oregon